The following highways are numbered 147:

Canada
 Prince Edward Island Route 147
 Quebec Route 147

Costa Rica
 National Route 147

India
 National Highway 147 (India)

Japan
 Japan National Route 147
 Fukuoka Prefectural Route 147
 Nara Prefectural Route 147

Malaysia
 Malaysia Federal Route 147

United States
 Alabama State Route 147
 Arkansas Highway 147
 California State Route 147
 Connecticut Route 147
 County Road 147 (Walton County, Florida)
 Georgia State Route 147
 Illinois Route 147
 Iowa Highway 147 (former)
 K-147 (Kansas highway)
 Kentucky Route 147
 Louisiana Highway 147
 Maryland Route 147
 Massachusetts Route 147
 M-147 (Michigan highway)
 County Road 147 (Cass County, Minnesota)
 County Road 147 (Ramsey County, Minnesota)
 Missouri Route 147
 Nevada State Route 147
 New Jersey Route 147
 New Mexico State Road 147
 New York State Route 147
 County Route 147 (Monroe County, New York)
 County Route 147 (Seneca County, New York)
 North Carolina Highway 147
 Ohio State Route 147
 Oklahoma State Highway 147
 Pennsylvania Route 147
 South Dakota Highway 147 (former)
 Tennessee State Route 147
 Texas State Highway 147
 Texas State Highway Spur 147
 Farm to Market Road 147
 Utah State Route 147
 Vermont Route 147
 Virginia State Route 147
 Wisconsin Highway 147

Territories
 Puerto Rico Highway 147 (former)